Daath may refer to:

Da'at (Kabbalah), a mystical state in Kabbalah
Dååth, an American death metal band